Mahir Halili (born 30 June 1975) is an Albanian retired footballer. He played for Tirana, Dinamo Tirana, Kastrioti Krujë and his last team Partizani Tirana. He also played abroad in Switzerland with SR Delémont in the 1997–98 season and in Slovenia with ND Gorica where he played for two seasons from 1998 to 2000. He was also a member of the Albania national team from 1996 to 1999.

Club career

Tirana
On 10 May 2003, Halili scored four goals in a 6–1 home win against Bylis Ballsh. Tirana ended the 2002–03 in the first place, 11 points above Vllaznia Shkodër. In personal terms, Halili ended the season with 20 league goals, beating out his rival Vioresin Sinani.

International career
Halili made his international debut on 24 April 1996 against Bosnia and Herzegovina in its second international recognized match, coming on as an 80th minute substitute in a goalless draw. He scored his first goal on 21 January 1998 in his fourth international appearance in the historical 4–1 friendly victory over Turkey; he scored in under a minute after being put on as a substitute for Arjan Peço. He earned a total of 13 caps, scoring 1 goal. His final international was an August 1999 European Championship qualification match against Slovenia.

Honours

Club
Tirana

Albanian Cup (2): 2000–01, 2001–02
Albanian Superliga (3): 2002–03, 2003–04, 2004–05

References

External links
 

1975 births
Living people
People from Dibër (municipality)
Association football midfielders
Albanian footballers
Albania international footballers
KS Kastrioti players
FK Dinamo Tirana players
SR Delémont players
ND Gorica players
KF Tirana players
FK Partizani Tirana players
Kategoria Superiore players
Albanian expatriate footballers
Expatriate footballers in Slovenia
Expatriate footballers in Switzerland
Albanian expatriate sportspeople in Slovenia
Albanian expatriate sportspeople in Switzerland